Robert Hirsch may refer to:
Robert L. Hirsch, American energy advisor
Robert Hirsch (actor) (1925–2017), French actor
Robert M. Hirsch, American hydrologist
Robert J. Hirsch (born 1949), American artist, curator, educator, historian, and author